Kverneland Group is an international company developing, producing and distributing agricultural implements, electronic solutions and digital services to the farming community. The company provides Agricultural Implement Technology through the equipment manufacturing offering. Kverneland Group offers a range of soil and seeding equipment, forage and bale equipment, spreading, spraying, electronic solutions, and digital farm services for agricultural tractors and implements.

Company history 
Kverneland Group was established by Ole Gabriel Kverneland in 1879. It became a limited company in 1894 and by the 1920s it had become Norway's largest supplier of agricultural products, particularly in ploughs. Kverneland remained a family-owned business until the company was listed on the Oslo Stock Exchange in 1983. Since the mid 1990s Kverneland Group has expanded  through acquisitions of other manufacturers  of agricultural implements.

Brands acquired by the Kverneland Group include Underhaug bale wrappers, Taarup Maskinfabrik disc mowers and hay tools, Maletti rotary harrows, Maschinenfabrik Accord seeding machines, Dutch Greenland Group fertiliser spreaders and grass product machinery, and RAU field sprayers. In 2008, the Taarup, Accord and RAU brand names were discontinued and replaced by the Kverneland name across the product range.

In 2010, Kverneland Group formed a long-term joint venture with Gallignani s.p.a. with a new range of round balers (fixed and variable chamber), wrappers and a new range of drum mowers. In 2011, Kverneland Group opened a new assembly plant in Daqing, China. In 2012, Kubota Corporation acquired Kverneland Group. Kverneland Group was delisted from the Oslo Stock Exchange in May 2012.

The company headquarters are located in Klepp, in the village of Kvernaland. Kverneland Group employs approximately 2,550 people worldwide, most of them in Europe. Kverneland Group owns the implement brands Kverneland and Vicon.

Kverneland Group’s factories are located in Norway, Denmark, Germany, France, The Netherlands, Italy, Russia and China. The Group has its own sales companies in 17 countries and exports to another 60 countries.

References

External links 

Kverneland Group (corporate web site)
Kverneland (brand web site)
Vicon (brand web site)

Manufacturing companies established in 1879
Companies based in Rogaland
Agriculture companies of Norway
Klepp
Jæren
Norwegian companies established in 1879

Companies formerly listed on the Oslo Stock Exchange